José Agustín Rodríguez (1899 – death date unknown) was a Cuban pitcher in the Negro leagues in the 1920s.

A native of Havana, Cuba, Rodríguez played for the Cuban Stars (West) in 1922. In 20 recorded appearances on the mound, he posted a 5.17 ERA over 92.1 innings. Rodríguez also played in the Cuban League.

References

External links
 and Baseball-Reference Black Baseball Stats and Seamheads

1899 births
Date of birth missing
Year of death missing
Place of death missing
Almendares (baseball) players
Cuban Stars (West) players
Baseball pitchers
Baseball players from Havana
Cuban expatriate baseball players in the United States